Cremnoceramus ("cremno-" = kremnos [Greek]: precipice or over hanging wall or bank; "ceramus" = keramos [Greek]: clay pot) is an extinct genus of fossil marine pteriomorphian bivalves that superficially resembled the related winged pearly oysters of the extant genus Pteria. They lived from the Turonian to the Maastrichtian of the Late Cretaceous.

Description 
Cremnoceramus were facultatively mobile, blind, suspension feeding bivalves with low-magnesium calcite shells.
Inoceramids, like the Cremnoceramus in particular, had thick shells composed of particular "prisms" of calcite deposited perpendicular to the surface, and unweathered fossils commonly preserve the mother-of-pearl luster the shells had in life. Compared to the many examples of broad and flattened Inoceramidae, Cremnoceramus shells are rather "high-walled", deep bowl-shaped. The top shell is commonly encrusted with oysters.

Species 
The following species are recognized:

 C. crassus
 C. deformis
 C. inconstans
 C. rotundatus
 C. waltersdorfensis

Biostratigraphic significance 
The first appearance of the species Cremnoceramus rotundatus marks the beginning of the Coniacian stage.

Distribution 
Fossils of the genus have been found in:
 Gosau Formation, Austria
 Cotinguiba Formation, Brazil
 Pointe-Noire, Congo-Brazzaville
 Jicin, the Czech Republic
 Arnager Limestone Formation, Denmark
 Craie de Villedieu Formation, France
 Germany
 Anaipadi Formation, India
 Tongobury, Madagascar
 Austin Group, Mexico
 Sant Corneli and El Zadorra Formation, Spain
 Lewes Nodular Chalk Formation, the United Kingdom
 Niobrara Formation, New Mexico, United States

Gallery 
Note the oyster encrustation of the top shells:

References 

Inoceramidae
Prehistoric bivalve genera
Index fossils
 
Cretaceous Austria
Fossils of Austria
Cretaceous Brazil
Fossils of Brazil
Fossils of the Czech Republic
Cretaceous Denmark
Fossils of Denmark
Cretaceous France
Fossils of France
Cretaceous Germany
Fossils of Germany
Cretaceous India
Fossils of India
Cretaceous Madagascar
Fossils of Madagascar
Cretaceous Mexico
Fossils of Mexico
Cretaceous Spain
Fossils of Spain
Cretaceous England
Fossils of England
Cretaceous geology of New Mexico
Fossils of the United States
Fossil taxa described in 1969